The following are the appointments to various Canadian Honours of 2009. Usually, they are announced as part of the New Year and Canada Day celebrations and are published within the Canada Gazette during year. This follows the custom set out within the United Kingdom which publishes its appoints of various British Honours for New Year's and for monarch's official birthday. However, instead of the midyear appointments announced on Victoria Day, the official birthday of the Canadian Monarch, this custom has been transferred with the celebration of Canadian Confederation and the creation of the Order of Canada.

However, as the Canada Gazette publishes appointment to various orders, decorations and medal, either Canadian or from Commonwealth and foreign states, this article will reference all Canadians so honoured during the 2009 calendar year.

Provincial Honours are not listed within the Canada Gazette, however they are listed within the various publications of each provincial government. Provincial honours are listed within the page.

The Order of Merit

 The Right Honourable Joseph Jacques Jean Chrétien,

The Order of Canada

Companions of the Order of Canada

 Céline Dion, C.C., O.Q. - This is a promotion within the Order
 Ben Heppner, C.C. - This is a promotion within the Order
 Stephen A. Jarislowsky, C.C., G.O.Q. - This is a promotion within the Order
 Peter Munk, C.C. - This is a promotion within the Order
 The Honourable Michel Bastarache, C.C. 

 Wayne Gretzky, C.C. - This is a promotion within the Order 
 Harley Norman Hotchkiss, C.C., A.O.E. - This is a promotion within the Order 
 Robert Lepage, C.C., O.Q. - This is a promotion within the Order

 Chantal Petitclerc, C.C., C.Q., M.S.M.

Honorary Officer of the Order of Canada

 Sima Samar, O.C.

Officer of the Order of Canada

 Gary Birch, O.C.
 The Honourable Iona V. Campagnolo, P.C., O.C., O.B.C. * This is a promotion within the Order 
 William J. Commanda, O.C.
 Paul E. Garfinkel, O.C.
 Dave Joe, O.C.
 The Honourable Michael J. Kirby, O.C.
 Arvind Koshal, O.C.
 Claude R. Lamoureux, O.C.
 Louise Lecavalier, O.C.

 The Honourable Allan J. MacEachen, P.C., O.C.
 David P. O'Brien, O.C.
 Ian C.P. Smith, O.C.
 The Honourable Barry L. Strayer, O.C.
 George Hector Beaton, O.C. 
 Ian Bruce, O.C. 
 John W. Crow, O.C. 

 Laurence Freeman, O.C., O.S.B. 
 Crawford Stanley Holling, O.C. 
 Peter Jaffe, O.C. Peter Jaffe, O.C.
 Donald K. Johnson, O.C. - This is a promotion within the Order
 Anita Kunz, O.C. 
 The Honourable Sterling R. Lyon, P.C., O.C. 

 The Honourable John P. Manley, P.C., O.C. 

 The Honourable A. Anne McLellan, P.C., O.C. 
 The Honourable Roland Roy McMurtry, O.C., O.Ont. 
 Wajdi Mouawad, O.C. Wajdi Mouawad, O.C.
 Cornelia Hahn Oberlander, O.C. - This is a promotion within the Order
 Jack Rabinovitch, O.C., O.Ont. - This is a promotion within the Order
 Françoise Sullivan, O.C., C.Q. - This is a promotion within the Order
 Donald Winston Thompson, O.C.

Honorary Member of the Order of Canada
 Zachary Richard, C.M.

Members of the Order of Canada
 Michael A. Baker, C.M.
 Joyce Barkhouse, C.M., O.N.S.
 Elsa Bolam, C.M. 
 David Bouchard, C.M. 
 David A. Brown, C.M. 
 Dinu Bumbaru, C.M.
 Fred Carmichael, C.M.
 Douglas Cole, C.M.
 Gail Cook-Bennett, C.M.
 Max Cynader, C.M., O.B.C.
 James J. Douglas, C.M.

 Fred S. Fountain, C.M
 Arlene Haché, C.M.
 Kenneth Kernaghan, C.M.
 M. Azhar Ali Khan, C.M.
 LaVerne Kindree, C.M.

 Suzanne Lapointe, C.M.
 John F. Lewis, C.M.
 Frank L. Lovsin, C.M.
 David Matas, C.M.
 Gordon A. McBean, C.M.
 Barbara McInnes, C.M. 
 Don McKay, C.M. 
 James H. Morrison, C.M. 
 K. Alexander Nilsson, C.M. 
 Allison D. O'Brien, C.M. 
 Willie E. O'Ree, C.M., O.N.B. 
 Lata Pada, C.M. 
 Brian Paisley, C.M.
 Ross E. Petty, C.M. 
 Douglas Pollard, C.M. 
 Victor M. Power, C.M.
 Elinor Gill Ratcliffe, C.M., O.N.L. 
 Angela Rebeiro, C.M.
 Henry P. Rourke, C.M.
 The Honourable Herbert O. Sparrow, C.M. 
 Donald W. Storch, C.M. 
 David Thauberger, C.M. 
 Pierre Théroux, C.M.
 William J. Wall, C.M. 
 Shirley Westeinde, C.M.
 Carolyn Anne Baker, C.M. 
 Stan Bevington, C.M. 
 Melvin James Boutilier, C.M. 
 Deane Cameron, C.M. 
 Savvas Chamberlain, C.M. 
 Archie Charles, C.M. 
 Victor Cicansky, C.M. 
 Ian D. Clark, C.M. 
 Hélène Desmarais, C.M. 
 Patrick Doherty, C.M. 
 Maureen Doherty, C.M. 
 George Gate, C.M. 
 Daniel Germain, C.M., C.Q., M.S.M. 
 A. Alan Giachino, C.M.
 Susan Jane Glass, C.M. 
 Shirley E. Greenberg, C.M. 
 David Helwig, C.M. 
 Jack Stanley Hodgins, C.M. 
 Jay Ingram, C.M. 
 Winston Kassim, C.M.
 Krishna Kumar, C.M., S.O.M. 
 Claude Lebouthillier, C.M. 
 Roderick R. McInnes, C.M. 
 Sylvio Michaud, C.M. 
 Mahmood A. Naqvi, C.M., O.N.S. 
 Jean O’Neil, C.M., C.Q. 
 Roland Priddle, C.M. 
 Edward Moxon Roberts, C.M. 
 Paul Stubbing, C.M. 
 Peter Ridgway Taylor, C.M. 
 Ian MacEwan Thom, C.M. 
 Marvin Tile, C.M. 
 Nancy Turner, C.M. 
 Jeanne Mary Wolfe, C.M. 
 Donald Alcoe Young, C.M. 
 Madeline Ziniak, C.M., O.Ont.

Termination of an appointment to the Order of Canada
  T. Sher Singh
 René Racine
 Jacqueline Richard
 Cardinal Jean-Claude Turcotte

Order of Military Merit

Commanders of the Order of Military Merit

 Major-General C. J. R. Davis, C.M.M., C.D. 
 Major-General A. G. Hines, C.M.M., C.D. - This is a promotion within the Order
 Vice-Admiral Joseph Alphonse Denis Rouleau, C.M.M., M.S.M., C.D. - This is a promotion within the Order
 Major General W. Semianiw, C.M.M., M.S.C., C.D. - This is a promotion within the Order
 Major-General D. C. Tabbernor, C.M.M., C.D. - This is a promotion within the Order

Officers of the Order of Military Merit

 Colonel L. E. Aitken, O.M.M., C.D. 
 Brigadier-General J. G. J. C. Barabé, O.M.M., C.D. 
 Colonel S. A. Becker, O.M.M., C.D. 
 Colonel F. M. Boomer, O.M.M., C.D. 
 Colonel K. R. Cotten, O.M.M., C.D. 
 Lieutenant-Colonel T. M. Crosby, O.M.M., C.D. 
 Lieutenant-Colonel R. Jetly, O.M.M., C.D. 
 Colonel J. C. G. Juneau, O.M.M., M.S.M., C.D. 
 Colonel C. R. King, O.M.M., C.D., M.B.E. 
 Colonel R. Lapointe, O.M.M., C.D. 
 Colonel D. D. Marshall, O.M.M., C.D. 
 Colonel R. G. Mazzolin, O.M.M., C.D. 
 Colonel B. A. McQuade, O.M.M., C.D. 
 Major B. D. Milligan, O.M.M., C.D. 
 Colonel J. A. J. Parent, O.M.M., C.D. 
 Commander J. R. L. Pelletier, O.M.M., C.D. 
 Captain L. P. Phillips, O.M.M., C.D. 
 Lieutenant-Colonel G. M. Pratt, O.M.M., C.D. 
 Captain(N) D. L. Sing, O.M.M., C.D. 

 Colonel J. H. Vance, O.M.M., C.D. 
 Major E. M. Vaughan, O.M.M., C.D. 
 Colonel K. L. Woiden, O.M.M., C.D.

Members of the Order of Military Merit

 Chief Warrant Officer G. D. Alex, M.M.M., C.D. 
 Chief Warrant Officer A. G. Atwell, M.M.M., C.D. 
 Master Warrant Officer D. A. Badgerow, M.M.M., C.D. 
 Master Warrant Officer D. F. Bates, M.M.M., C.D. 
 Major W. J. Beaudoin, M.M.M., C.D. 
 Warrant Officer L. R. Canam, M.M.M., C.D. 
 Corporal J. T. Chalmer, M.M.M., C.D. 
 Warrant Officer M. B. L. Chassé, M.M.M., C.D. 
 Chief Petty Officer 2nd Class R. B. Clark-McKay, M.M.M., C.D. 
 Sergeant J. G. D. Cloutier, M.M.M., C.D. 
 Sergeant A. C. Comé, M.M.M., C.D. 
 Chief Warrant Officer J. M. J. C. Cournoyer, M.M.M., C.D. 
 Chief Warrant Officer D. W. Coxall, M.M.M., C.D. 
 Master Warrant Officer D. J. Curtis, M.M.M., M.S.M., C.D. 
 Chief Warrant Officer J. F. G. Daigle, M.M.M., C.D. 
 Chief Warrant Officer J. W. Dalke, M.M.M., C.D. 
 Warrant Officer G. P. Della Valle, M.M.M., C.D. 
 Sergeant K. G. Dickson, M.M.M., C.D. 
 Major P. A. Douglass, M.M.M., C.D. 
 Chief Warrant Officer K. G. Drew, M.M.M., C.D. 
 Captain R. B. Dueck, M.M.M., C.D. 
 Petty Officer 1st Class P. R. Egli, M.M.M., C.D. 
 Sergeant S. R. Elliston, M.M.M., C.D. 
 Chief Warrant Officer D. W. Ells, M.M.M., C.D. 
 Chief Petty Officer 1st Class B. F. Fisher, M.M.M., C.D. 
 Chief Warrant Officer J. P. C. Fortin, M.M.M., C.D. 
 Captain D. P. Gayton, M.M.M., C.D. L
 Lieutenant-Commander J. M. P. Godin, M.M.M., C.D. 
 Lieutenant-Commander P. M. Gould, M.M.M., C.D. 
 Warrant Officer J. M. L. Guillemette, M.M.M., C.D. 
 Master Warrant Officer B. F. Gutoskie, M.M.M., C.D. 
 Sergeant D. F. Haley, M.M.M., C.D. 
 Chief Warrant Officer J. K. Hamalainen, M.M.M., C.D. 
 Captain P. J. Hillier, M.M.M., C.D. 
 Chief Warrant Officer G. A. Hughes, M.M.M., C.D. 
 Master Warrant Officer G. A. Innis, M.M.M., C.D.
 Chief Petty Officer 2nd Class P. N. Jacobs, M.M.M., C.D. 
 Master Warrant Officer J. M. Juraszko, M.M.M., C.D. 
 Warrant Officer C. A. Krammer, M.M.M., C.D. 
 Captain J. C. R. Labrecque, M.M.M., C.D. 
 Chief Warrant Officer J. J. M. Landry, M.M.M., M.S.M., C.D. 
 Chief Warrant Officer G. Laverdière, M.M.M., C.D. 
 Chief Warrant Officer K. M. Lee, M.M.M., C.D. 
 Master Warrant Officer K. L. Lewis, M.M.M., C.D. 
 Lieutenant-Commander R. D. Leyte, M.M.M., C.D. 
 Chief Warrant Officer D. G. Libby, M.M.M., C.D. 
 Chief Warrant Officer L. J. Limoges, M.M.M., C.D. 
 Master Warrant Officer J. G. Lizotte, M.M.M., C.D. 
 Master Warrant Officer M. P. Manoukarakis, M.M.M., C.D. 
 Chief Petty Officer 2nd class J. A. R. P. Massé, M.M.M., C.D. 
 Warrant Officer W. P. Meuse, M.M.M., C.D. 
 Chief Warrant Officer M. H. Miller, M.M.M., C.D. 
 Master Warrant Officer W. L. Mooney, M.M.M., C.D. 
 Warrant Officer J. V. Murphy, M.M.M., C.D. 
 Chief Warrant Officer J. E. D. Noël, M.M.M., C.D. 
 Master Warrant Officer W. F. O’Toole, M.M.M., M.S.C., C.D. 
 Chief Warrant Officer M. J. Y. Ouellet, M.M.M., C.D. 
 Major D. J. Parker, M.M.M., C.D. 
 Captain T. M. Pettigrew, M.M.M., C.D. 
 Chief Petty Officer 2nd Class C. A. Radimer, M.M.M., C.D. 
 Sergeant (Ranger) L. E. Ramsey, M.M.M. 
 Chief Petty Officer 2nd Class S. M. Rideout, M.M.M., C.D. 
 Master Warrant Officer J. A. R. Rodrigue, M.M.M., C.D. 
 Chief Warrant Officer C. P. Rusk, M.M.M., C.D. 
 Chief Warrant Officer T. J. Secretan, M.M.M., C.D. 
 Master Warrant Officer J. Y. C. M. Séguin, M.M.M., C.D. 
 Master Warrant Officer A. W. Simmons, M.M.M., C.D. 
 Warrant Officer M. P. Snea, M.M.M., C.D. 
 Master Warrant Officer K. H. Stadnick, M.M.M., C.D. 
 Master Warrant Officer D. C. Steiger, M.M.M., C.D. 
 Major J. K. Stewart, M.M.M., C.D. 
 Sergeant (Ranger) A. G. Sutherland, M.M.M. 
 Chief Petty Officer 2nd Class A. J. Tiffin, M.M.M., C.D. 
 Lieutenant-Commander I. D. Torrie, M.M.M., C.D. 
 Chief Warrant Officer N. R. Townsend, M.M.M., C.D.
 Major R. J. A. Tremblay, M.M.M., C.D. 
 Lieutenant-Commander B. A. Vallis, M.M.M., C.D. 
 Warrant Officer D. Verreault, M.M.M., C.D.
 Master Warrant Officer R. F. Vida, M.M.M., C.D.
 Chief Warrant Officer G. W. Wallace, M.M.M., C.D. 
 Chief Warrant Officer P. J. Whelan, M.M.M., C.D. 
 Master Warrant Officer P. C. Whipps, M.M.M., C.D. 
 Captain I. J. Willis, M.M.M., C.D.

Order of Merit of the Police Forces

Officers of the Order of Merit of the Police Forces

 Assistant Commissioner Stephen William Graham - This is a promotion within the Order
 Chief Inspector Jocelyn Latulippe 
 Assistant Commissioner Gary R. (Bud) Mercer 
 Superintendent Lloyde F. Plante 
 Superintendent Michael Jay Sekela

Members of the Order of Merit of the Police Forces

 Chief Paul Douglas Cook Chef Paul Douglas Cook
 Staff Superintendent Anthony D. Corrie 
 Chief R. M. Brent Crowhurst 
 Inspector Frederic Leigh DesRoches I
 Provincial Constable Richard J. Ellins 
 Staff Superintendent Michael Federico 
 Detective Superintendent Ronald James Gentle 
 Staff Sergeant Roy H. E. Hill 
 Inspector John Clifton House 
 Deputy Chief Kenneth John Jackman 
 Chief Inspector Luc Lafleur 
 Sergeant Jean Lamothe 
 Mr. Charles A. R. Lawrence 
 Deputy Chief Kenneth James Leendertse 
 Acting Sergeant Katherine J. Macdonald 
 Staff Sergeant George Frederick Heber Noseworthy 
 Provincial Constable Jerry Novack 
 Inspector Anthony (Adam) Palmer 
 Chief Daniel Colin Parkinson 
 Assistant Director Pierre-Paul Pichette 
 Deputy Chief Constable Robert D. Rolls 
 Staff Sergeant Ian Charles Sanderson 
 Staff Superintendent Peter J. M. Sloly 
 Assistant Commissioner William Allan Smith 
 Staff Sergeant Major William Henry Sparkes 
 Constable Linda G. Stewart 
 Superintendent Ronald Taverner 
 Corporal Spurgeon Kenneth Walker 
 Chief Superintendent J. A. M. (Mike) Woods

Most Venerable Order of the Hospital of St. John of Jerusalem

Knights and Dames of the Order of St. John

 His Honour, the Honourable Pierre Duchesne

 His Honour, the Honourable John C. Crosbie, P.C., O.N., O.N.L.
 Lieutenant-Colonel (Retired) Pierre Alexandre Bibeau, C.D.
 Major Félix Bouchard, C.D.
 Brigadier-General (Retired) Jean Gervais, C.D.
 Lieutenant Luc Pellerin
 Geoffrey Leonard Wybrew

Commanders of the Order of St. John
 Mairi Christina Arthur
 Major Richard Choquette, C.D.
 Honorary Colonel Ross Gaudreault
 Robert James Houston, O.M.M., C.D.
 Jim Yuan Lai
 Brigadier-General (Retired) Stewart E. McGowan, C.D.
 Lieutenant-Colonel (Retired) Hugh Patrick Mundell, C.D.

Officers of the Order of St. John
 Her Honour Ginette Lamoureux
 Her Honour Jane Furneaux Crosbie
 William John Shannon Elliott
 Beverley Busson, C.O.M., O.B.C.
 Catherine Mary Bowlen
 Kirk Woodruff Corkery, C.D.
 Marie Dumais
 Michael Dussault
 Lieutenant (N) Peter B. Ferst, C.D.,
 Andrea Feys
 Juanita M. Hanney
 Brian Allan Kinaschuk
 Dorothy Kay Kirkwood
 Lieutenant-Colonel Keith Michael Lawrence, C.D.
 John Stewart Archibald LeForte
 Captain William Michael Lowe, C.D.,
 Charles R. M. McCormack
 Charles McVicker
 Steven D. Murphy
 Lieutenant (N) Scott Edward Nelson, A.D.C.
 Antonio Pergola
 Timothy Rees
 Russell Scott Reid, C.D.
 Judith-Anne Robinson
 T. Craig Wilson
 Raymond Tze Hung Woo

Members of the Order of St. John
 Master Corporal Jacqueline L. Beard
 Marika Lemstra Beaumont
 Gyuszi S. Berki
 Sarah Michelle Bigelow
 Marc Joseph Luc Boucher
 Jun Manghi Cadiente
 Philip John Casimiri
 D. Lorne Charbonneau
 Captain Karina Choquette
 Anthony Chui
 Andrew Collins
 Leigh-Ann E. Cooper
 Captain Shane Crawford, C.D.
 Joseph D. Dallos
 Lucie Dion
 Annie Kim Doyon
 Tiffany Lee Eyre Evans
 Joseph Longueuil Gaspardone
 Sandra Michelle Gaspardone
 Huguette Grondines
 Hélène M. Hawn
 Ryan Jonathan Hendren
 Michael Douglas Gordon Hewitt
 Marie Roseann Hoven
 Mary Mavis Hurley
 Steven Scott Imrie
 Darlene Mae Jedras
 Clarke G. Johnson
 Jo-Ann Rita Johnston
 Mark Leslie Kennedy, C.D.
 Julie Anne Kirke
 Evelyn Eleanor Teresa Kostal
 Alain Lapointe
 Annie Leblanc
 Donald J. LeBlanc
 Miguel Leblanc
 Douglas Gordon Longley
 Paul Owen Lovell
 Angus Rankin F. MacDonald
 Jim F. W. MacKay
 Cindy Carol Maitre
 Warrant Officer John Nayduk
 Master Warrant Officer David Russell Nicolle, C.D.
 Adam Nathan Parker
 Jean Pellerin
 Lieutenant-Colonel Richard Allan Phillips
 David Scott Ryckman
 Sarah Anita Scott
 Carolyn Frances Scrovitch
 Ricci Ritva Anneli Silvo
 Michael David Simpson
 Daphne Eleanor Smith
 Inspector Robert Shinichi Usui
 Margaret Wynn Wicklum

Provincial Honours

National Order of Québec

Grand Officers of the National Order of Québec

 The Honourable Louise Arbour, GOQ
 Brenda Milner, CC, GOQ
 Guy Saint-Pierre, CC, GOQ

Officers of the National Order of Québec 

 René Angélil, OQ
 André Desmarais, OC, OQ 
 Paul Desmarais, Jr. OC, OQ
 Mostafa M. Elhil, OC, OQ
 Céline Galipeau, OQ
 Claude Lamoureux, OC, OQ, O.Ont
 Heather Munroe-Blum, OC, OQ
 Robert Normand, OQ
 Louise Roy, OQ
 Yoav Talmi, OQ

Knight of the National Order of Québec

 Pita Aatami, CQ
 Marius Arsenault, CQ
 André Bourbeau, CQ
 Jacques Brown, CQ
 Raymond Carignan, CQ
 Claude Cormier, CQ
 Christiane Germain, CQ
 Margie Gillis, CQ
 Jean-Claude Labrecque, CQ
 Normand Laprise, CQ
 Gilles Latulippe, CM, CQ
 Jean Leclerc, CQ
 Alain Lefèvre, CQ
 Mario Lemieux, CQ
 Franco Lepore, CQ, FRSC
 Nicole Marcil-Gratton, CQ
 Samuel Pierre, CQ
 Michael Sheehan, CQ
 Walter Sieber, CQ
 Martine Tremblay, CQ
 Michèle Viau-Chagnon, CQ

Saskatchewan Order of Merit

 Casimir J. Broda, S.O.M. (1929‐2016)
 Dr. Sharon A. Butala, O.C., S.O.M., LL.D.
 Dr. Donald Grant Devine, S.O.M., F.A.I.C.
 Elder Alma Kytwayhat, S.O.M. (1942‐2011)  
 Harold H. MacKay, O.C., S.O.M., Q.C., LL.B., LL.M., LL.D., F.A.I.C., F.I.C.D.
 Jack MacKenzie, S.O.M.
 Dr. David Millar, S.O.M.
 Arne F. Petersen, S.O.M.
 Linda K. Rudachyk, S.O.M.
 Lorne Scott, C.M., S.O.M.
 William Shurniak, S.O.M., LL.D.
 Geoffrey Ursell, S.O.M.

Order of Ontario

Constance Backhouse 
Dr. Philip Berger 
Lawrence Bloomberg 
Lesley Jane Boake 
Dr. Helen Chan 
Peter Crossgrove
Mike DeGagné
Levente Diosady
Fraser Dougall 
Jacques Flamand
Jean Gagnon 
Paul Godfrey 
Peter Godsoe
Ovid Jackson
Dr. Kellie Leitch
Gerry Lougheed, Jr.
Diana Mady Kelly 
Naseem Mahdi
Dr. Samantha Nutt 
Dr. James Orbinski 
Bonnie Patterson
Shirley Peruniak 
Alice Porter
Ken Shaw 
Janet Stewart 
Shirley Thomson
George Turnbull
Dr. Mladen Vranic 
Dr. Anne-Marie Zajdlik

Order of British Columbia

 Brandt Louie; 
 Robert E.W. Hancock; 
 Hart Buckendahl; 
 Dr. Michael Hayden; 
 Peter Dhillon; 
 Dr. Ray Markham; 
 Leon Bibb
 Dolores Kirkwood; 
 Clarence Thomas (Manny) Jules; 
 Roy Akira Miki; 
 Dr. Linda Warren; 
 Sam Belzberg; 
 D. Ross Fitzpatrick

Alberta Order of Excellence

Order of Prince Edward Island

Order of Manitoba

Order of New Brunswick

Order of Nova Scotia

Order of Newfoundland and Labrador

Canadian Bravery Decorations

Star of Courage

 Sergeant David John Cooper, C.D.
 Petty Officer 2nd Class Drew D. Dazzo
 Constable Christopher George Garrett (posthumous)
 Sergeant Dwayne B. Guay, C.D.
 Petty Officer 2nd Class James Alexander Leith, M.S.M., C.D.
 Mathew B. Vizbulis

Medal of Bravery

 Ryan Cecil Atwin
 Constable Daniel William Bailey
 Mark Barnard
 Jerrica Lynn Bartlett
 Gerard Beernaerts
 Geneviève Bergeron-Collin
 Deborah Anne Chiborak
 Constable Aaron Courtney
 Michael Cruz
 Marshall Davis
 Sean James Deakin
 Robert Joseph Kyle Donelle
 William Joseph Fitzpatrick
 Evan John Michael Green
 Bonnoir Hadjadj
 Robert Hardy
 Shaun Harper
 Corporal Frédéric Heppell
 Constable Nathalie Hervieux
 Andrew Douglas Hilderman
 Alexander Hrycyk
 John Jew
 Gerry Kuczek
 Wayne Kuczek
 Michael David Landry
 Nicholas Levi Francis Lannigan
 Constable François Lavoie
 G. Gregory Lawlor
 Chris MacLean 
 Stephen Mallett
 RCMP Constable James Allan Munro
 Philippe O. Murphy
 OPP Provincial Constable Gino Nolet
 OPP Provincial Constable James D. Orser
 Carol Parent
 Harry Prymak
 Daniel Reynolds
 Robert Ringuette
 Constable Yves Rousseau
 Kelsey Jessica Roy
 Shawn Sangha
 Michel Talbi
 OPP Provincial Constable Bruce A. Thompson
 Tony Neil Tingskou
 David Glenn Virgoe (posthumous)
 OPP Provincial Constable Darrell Wagner
 Mackenzie Ramesh Smythe Walker
 Robert A. Walker
 Caroline Young
 Constable Kevin Wade Zeh

Meritorious Service Decorations

Meritorious Service Medal (Military Division)

 LIEUTENANT-COLONEL LYNDON ANDERSON, M.S.M., AUSTRALIAN ARMY
 COLONEL STEVEN M. CZEPIGA, M.S.M. (Retired), UNITED STATES ARMY
 CHIEF PETTY OFFICER 1ST CLASS MICHAEL PATRICK GOURLEY, M.M.M., M.S.M., C.D.
 MAJOR TREVOR GOSSELIN, M.S.M., C.D. 
 MAJOR CHRISTOPHER ROBIN HENDERSON, M.S.M., C.D
 COLONEL BERND HORN, O.M.M., M.S.M., C.D. 
 COMMANDER JOSEPH HONORÉ PATRICK ST-DENIS, M.S.M., C.D. (Retired)

Secret appointments

 Her Excellency the Right Honourable Michaëlle Jean, Governor General and Commander-in-Chief of Canada, on the recommendation of the Chief of the Defence Staff, has awarded one Meritorious Service Cross and four Meritorious Service Medals to members of the Canadian Special Operations Forces Command for military activities of high standard that have brought great honour to the Canadian Forces and to Canada. For security and operational reasons, recipients’ names and citations have not been released.

Commonwealth and Foreign Orders, Decorations and Medal awarded to Canadians

From Her Majesty The Queen in Right of the United Kingdom

The Most Excellent Order of the British Empire

Member
 Captain Bryan N. Mialkowsky
 Mr. Colin Ploughman

Iraq Medal
 Major Scott Douglass Campbell
 Major Timothy Edward Hall

Operational Service Medal (Iraq)
 Lieutenant-Colonel Malcolm D. Bruce
 Major Daniel J. Dandurand
 Captain Jeremy Keith Alexander Fountain
 Lieutenant-Colonel Robert J. Martin
 Major Eric Thorson
 Lieutenant-Colonel Richard D. Vincent
 Major Paul Gautron

Operational Service Medal (Afghanistan)
 Master Warrant Officer Douglas K. Loader
 Captain Travis D. Wert

From the President of Argentina

Knight of the Order of May
 Mr. Patrick Riley

From the President of Austria

Grand Decoration of Honour in Gold with Star
 Mr. Maurice Strong

Grand Decoration of Honour
 Mr. Jean-Jacques Van Vlasselaer

Decoration of Merit in Gold
 Mrs. Brigitte Hekers
 Mr. Herbert Wolf
 Mr. Scott Keir Anderson
 Mr. Hans Kroisenbrunner
 Ms. Heidi Temelie

Grand Decoration of Honour in Silver with Star
 Mr. Laurent Beaudoin

From His Majesty The King of the Belgians

Grand Cross of the Order of the Crown
 Mr. Phillippe Kirsch

From the President of Colombia

Grand Cross of the National Order of Merit

 The Honourable Louise Arbour

From Her Majesty The Queen of Denmark

Knight First Class of the Order of the Dannebrog
 Mr. John B. Petersen

From the President of French Republic

National Order of the Legion of Honour

Commander
 Mr. Claude Laverdure

Officer
 The Honourable Serge Joyal

 Mrs. Denise Bombardier

Knight
 Professor Mark A. Wainberg

 Mr. David Cronenberg

National Order of Merit

Knight
 Mrs. Louise Baron
 Mr. Daniel Muzyka
 Mrs. Mona Nemer

Order of the Academic Palms

Commander
 Mr. Marcel Masse

Officer
 Mr. Bruno-Marie Bechard
 Mr. Pierre Lapointe
 Mr. Pierre Moreau
 Mr. Luc Vinet

Knight
 Mrs. Renée Pelland-Legendre
 Mrs. Munirah Amra Lakhi
 Mrs. Claire Bergeron Boivin
 Mrs. Margot Bolduc
 Mrs. Murielle Comeau
 Mr. Robert Cormier
 Mr. Jacques Couturier
 Mrs. Martha Crago Borgmann
 Mrs. Nedialka Gorinov Stefanova
 Mrs. Kathryn Hamer

National Defence Medals

National Defence Medal, Gold Echelon with Clasp « Gendarmerie nationale »
 Captain José Bernard
 Sergeant Jean Gagnon

National Defence Medal, Gold Echelon
 Brigadier-General Richard Blanchette

National Defence Medal, Silver Echelon, with Clasps « Bâtiments de combat » and « Missions d’assistance extérieure »
 Lieutenant(N) Jonathan Simard-Mercier

National Defence Medal, Bronze Echelon with Clasps Gendarmerie nationale
 Corporal Neil James Wentzell

National Defence Medal, Bronze Echelon with Clasps Land Force
 Master Sergeant Benoit Bergeron

Overseas Medal with “Lebanon” Clasp
 Lieutenant(N) Jonathan Simard-Mercier

French Commemorative Medal with Clasp ex-Yugoslavia
 Major Doris Gobeil

From the President of Hungary

Commander’s Cross of the Order of Merit

 General Raymond Henault, C.M.M., M.S.C., C.D.

Knight’s Cross of the Order of Merit (Civil Division)
 Mr. Pat Cortina

From the President of Italy

Order of the Star of Solidarity

Commander
 Mr. Orazio Pillitteri
 Mr. James Di Luca
 Mr. Marc Muzzo
 Mr. Gregory Sorbara

Knight
 Mr. Umberto Manca Berretta
 Mr. Antonio Falcone
 Mr. Bruno Giammaria
 Mr. Ermanno La Riccia
 Mr. Guelfo Regalino
 Mr. Luigi Ripandelli
 Mr. Angelo Sartor 
 Ms. Anna Maria Zampieri Pan

Order of Merit of the Italian Republic

Commander of the Order of Merit
 Mr. Luigi Mion

Knight of the Order of Merit
 Mr. Tarquinio Colavecchio
 Mr. Luciano Gonella
 Mr. Vincenzo Scida
 Mr. Albert De Luca
 Mr. Angelo Persichilli
 Mr. Tarquinio Colavecchio
 Mr. Giuseppe Nicastro
 Mr. Antonio Porretta

From His Majesty The Emperor of Japan

Order of the Rising Sun, Gold Rays with Neck Ribbon
 Mr. John Mark Powles
 Mr. Chow Yei Ching
 Dr. Joseph F. Kess
 Dr William Norrie

Order of the Rising Sun, Gold and Silver Rays
 Mr. Cy Hisao Saimoto
 Mr. Frankie P. Wu

Order of the Rising Sun, Gold Rays with Rosette
 Father Gabriel Boudreault

From the President of Kenya

Medal of Elder of the Order of the Burning Spear 
 Mr. Inderjeet Singh Bhoi

From the President of the Republic of Korea

Korea Service Medal
 Mr. Peter Seiersen

From the President of Latvia

Three Stars Order
 Dr. Vilis Mileiko
 Mr. Janis Briedis

Cross of Recognition
 Mr. Andris Kesteris

From the President of Lithuania

Order of Merit

Commander's Cross
 Mr. Pranas Gaida-Gaidamavicius

Knight's Cross
 Mr. Arunas Staskevicius

From the Government of Mali

Knight of the National Order
 Major Luc A. Racine (posthumous)

From the President of the United Mexican States

Band of the Mexican Order of the Aztec Eagle
 Mr. Gaëtan Lavertu

From Her Majesty The Queen of the Netherlands

Order of Orange-Nassau

Knight of the Order of Orange-Nassau
 Dr. Angus Bruneau

Member of the Order of Orange-Nassau
 Ms. Ruth Simpson

From the President of Nigeria

Knight of the Order of Merit
 Mr. Pierre Thomas
 Mr. Raynald Cloutier
 Mr. Jim Schneider

From the Secretary General of the North Atlantic Treaty Organisation

Meritorious Service Medal
 Mr. Aaron Boon
 Corporal Jerret Dickinson
 Brigadier-General Richard Blanchette
 Lieutenant-Colonel Réjean Duchesneau

 General Raymond Henault
 Colonel Greg Loos
 Colonel Jim McNaughton
 Commander Stuart Moors
 Mr. Kyle Pizzey
 Lieutenant-Colonel Thomas Ross

From His Majesty The King of Norway

Norwegian Participation Medal
 Mr. Leif Berget

From the President of Poland

Commander’s Cross of the Order of Merit
 Mr. Leszek Missala

Golden Cross of the Order of Merit
 Mrs. Ewa Barycka
 Mrs. Krystyna Budniak
 Mr. David Stephen Cassivi
 Mrs. Stefania Dulemba
 Mrs. Zofia Kata
 Mr. Frank Simpson
 Mrs. Elzbieta Szczepanska

Knight’s Cross of the Order of Merit
 Mrs. Wanda Bujalska
 Mr. Piotr Jassem
 Mrs. Jadwiga Sztrumf
 Mr. Czeslaw Borek
 Mr. Franciszek Garason
 Mr. Jan Jablonski
 Mr. Antoni Jedlinski
 Mrs. Maria Helena Kiczma
 Mr. Boguslaw Stanislaw Mosielski (posthumously)
 Mr. Mieczyslaw Slomiany
 Mrs. Shirley Mask Connolly
 Mr. David Shulist
 Mr. Kazimierz Tarnowski (posthumously)
 Reverend Aloysius Rekowski (posthumously)

Officer’s Cross of the Order of Polonia Restituta
 Mr. Marek Redka
 Mr. Wladyslaw Marcin Kluszczyński
 Mr. Edward Whitley (posthumously)

Knight’s Cross of the Order of Polonia Restitua
 Ms. Stanislawa (Sister Margaret) Górska

From the President of Russia

Order of Friendship
 Dr. Piotr Dutkiewicz

From His Majesty The King of Spain

Order of Civil Merit

Great Cross

 The Honourable Louise Arbour

Commander
 Mr. Jean-Pierre Andrieux

Officer
 Ms. Barbara Cappuccitti
 Mr. Gerry Shikatani
 Staff Sergeant Denis Amyot

From His Majesty The King of Sweden

Commander of the Royal Order of the Polar Star
 The Honourable Paule Gauthier
 Mr. Ron Shirkey

From the President of Ukraine

Order of Merit, 3rd Class
 Ms. Lisa Shymko 
 Dr. Zenon Kohut
 Dr. Volodymyr Mezentsev
 Dr. Yarema Kelebay
 Mr. Yurij Luhovy
 Mr. Peter Savaryn
 Dr. Roman Serbyn
 Mrs. Irene Sushko
 Mr. Radomir Bilash
 Mr. Stephan Horlatsch
 Ms. Daria Luciw
 Ms. Iryna Mycak
 Mr. Taras Hukalo
 Dr. Ehor W. Gauk
 Mr. Ostap Hawaleshka
 Mr. Leo Ledohowski

Order of Princess Olha, 3rd Class
 Mrs. Halyna Horun Levytsky

Medal for Noble Work and Virtue
 Mr. Bohdan Babiak
 Mrs. Slavka Shulakewych
 Mr. Eugene Krenosky
 Ms. Lesia Szwaluk
 Mr. Orest Warnyca
 Mr. Ivan Serbyn
 Ms. Margareta Shpir

From the President of the United States of America

Legion of Merit

Officer

 Vice-Admiral Drew W. Robertson
 Brigadier-General Gregory A. Young

Legionnaire
 Captain(N) Leslie J. Falloon

Bronze Star Medal with Oak Leaf Cluster
 Lieutenant-Colonel Darryl A. Mills

Bronze Star Medal
 Colonel Gary R. Stafford
 Captain James A. H. Chorley
 Chief Warrant Officer David W. Preeper
 Lieutenant-Colonel Darryl A. Mills
 Major Jay A. MacKeen

Meritorious Service Medal, First Oak Leaf Cluster
 Major Timothy W. Levatte

Meritorious Service Medal
 Chief Warrant Officer Kirby V. Burgess
 Master Warrant Officer Andrew F. Choquette
 Colonel Douglas A. MacLean
 Colonel Guy J. Maillet
 Major Patrice Paquin
 Major Paul G. Young
 Major Travis W. Brassington
 Lieutenant-Colonel Michel Heroux
 Major Robert B. Passant
 Lieutenant-Colonel Joseph R. Poulin
 Major Vincent Peter Wawryk
 Lieutenant-Colonel Wayne R. Krause
 Lieutenant-Colonel Darryl A. Mills
 Major Jason W. Stark

Air Medal
 Major Scott A. Hoffman
 Captain Reid I. Johnson
 Sergeant Danny R. Reid

Erratums of Commonwealth and Foreign Orders, Decorations and Medal awarded to Canadians

Corrected on 31 January 2009 
 Major-General Peter J. Devlin received the Legion of Merit from the President of the United States of America.

Corrected on 26 September 2009 
 Lieutenant-Colonel Wayne R. Krause received the Meritorious Service Medal from the President of the United States of America.

Corrected on 26 December 2009 
 Patrick Riley received the Knight of the Order of May from the President of Argentina.

References 

Monarchy in Canada